Solemn on Stage is Joey Yung's third Cantonese full-length studio album, released on 11 October 2001.

Background
This album was considered different compared to Joey's past albums, as it had a more variety of pop and less R&B, and lead Joey's music to a new direction, more like the music she is releasing now. This album included the theme of Joey's second solo concert and first solo concert series, ~H2O+ Solemn on Stage Live 2001. The concert theme, also the main track for this album, was originally called "Explosive Queen", as the concert was originally called "Explode the Hong Kong Coliseum Live". The concert name was then changed to its actual name after 11 September attack, thus also changing the name of the song. During the time this album was released, Joey voice was already starting to become strained, leading to the infamous voice loss incident that started later on that year.

Track listing

Joey Yung albums
2001 albums
Cantonese-language albums